Nejla is an Arabic given name for females, which means 'large-eyed'. People named Nejla include:

 Nejla Ateş, Turkish belly dancer
 Nejla Moalla, Tunisian engineer and politician
 Nejla Y. Yatkin, German-American choreographer
 Princess Nejla bint Asem, Jordanian princess

See also
 Necla, Turkish spelling

Arabic feminine given names